Alan Aubry (born 24 September 1974) is a French photographer. He graduated from the Art College of Rouen, France, in 1998.

Exhibitions
 2010 - Down Memory Lane. Maison d'arrêt des femmes. Rouen, France.
 2010 - Biographies. Pôle image de Haute-Normandie. Rouen, France.
 2008 - International Festival of Environmental Images - Off. Paris, France.
 2007 - Habiter, Face A Face B. Stanislas Castle, Commercy, France.
 2007 - Gala. Lied Discovery Children's Museum, Las Vegas, United States.
 2006 - Ouverture. Gallery Le Tracteur, Paris, France.
 2006 - Citadelle. Gallery Boumier, Versailles, France.
 2006 - Relais.' Gallery du Bellay, Mont-Saint-Aignan, France.
 2006 - Paris Photographique. Espace Beaurepaire, Paris, France.
 2005 - Les Nouveaux Lieux de Solitude. Pôle image de Haute-Normandie. Rouen, France.
 2005 - Citadelle. Gallery Plume. Le Mans, France.
 2005 - Rencontres Internationales de la Photographie. HypeGallery. Arles, France.
 2004 - Hypegallery. Palais de Tokyo, Paris, France.
 2002 - Les Iconoclasses.  Gallery Duchamp, Yvetot, France.

Photographic series
 2010 - Orania Afrikanertuiste. Portraits within a private town for Afrikaners only in South Africa.
 2008 - Orania. Photos within a private town for Afrikaners only in South Africa.
 2007 - Károlyháza. Photos within an old collective farm in Hungary.
 2007 - Habiter. Face A Face B, Photos within the city of Commercy, France. Worked with Antoine Doyen.
 2007 - Parcel(le)s. Photos within labor kitchen garden
 2007 - Zone vie. Photos within the air base of Évreux, France.
 2006 - La Corniche. Photos of residential pavilions under construction.
 2006 - Affaires culturelles. Photos within the offices of the French Cultural Department
 2005 - Citadelle. Photos of residential pavilions dig in behind a hedge of thuyas
 2005 - Rencontres. Photos of "risqué" meeting places around Rouen
 2005 - Habitat provisoire. Photos of dormitories in a vacation centre
 2005 - Desserte locale. Photographic inventory of all the panels indicating the entrance of the city of Rouen.
 2005 - La Rafale
 2005 - Abri-joueur. Photos of players' shelter on the border of playing fields.
 2005 - 11 mètres. Photos of goals from the penalty point.
 2004 - Retour vapeurs. Photos of petrol pumps.
 2004 - Propriété de l'État. Photos of a precise type of phone boxes.
 2004 - Voitures. Photos of abandoned cars, the time of a weekend, in the underground parking of a shopping center.
 2004 - Abribus. Photos of a precise type of bus shelter.
 2004 - Mesnil Roux. Photographie d'une zone délaissée d'un centre commercial.
 2003 - Intérieurs familiers. Photos from domestic inside which marked his childhood.

External links
 www.alan-aubry.com

Artists from Rennes
Living people
1974 births
21st-century French photographers
Landscape photographers